Black is a surname which can be of either English, Scottish, Irish or French origin. In the cases of non-English origin, the surname is likely to be an Anglicisation. Notable persons with that surname include:

List

A
Aaron Black (disambiguation), multiple people
Adam Black (disambiguation), multiple people
Aleister Black (born 1985), WWE ring name of Dutch professional wrestler Tom Büdgen
Aline Elizabeth Black, African-American schoolteacher
Alan Black (disambiguation), multiple people
Alexander Black (disambiguation), multiple people
Alf Black, English footballer
Amy Black (mezzo-soprano) (1973–2009), British mezzo-soprano singer
Andrew Black (disambiguation), multiple people
Ann Black, British Labour Party official
Ann Spence Black (1861–1947), British artist 
Arthur Black (disambiguation), multiple people

B
Baxter Black (1945–2022), American poet
Ben Black, rugby league player
Benjamin Black, pen-name of the Irish novelist John Banville
Bill Black (disambiguation), multiple people
Bo Black (1946–2020), American model
Bob Black (born 1951), American anarchist and author
Bobby Black (disambiguation), multiple people
Bruce D. Black (born 1947), American judge
Bud Black (born 1957), American baseball player
Bud Black (right-handed pitcher) (1932–2005), American baseball player
Byron Black (born 1969), Zimbabwean tennis player

C
Cara Black (born 1979), Zimbabwean tennis player
Catherine Black (disambiguation), multiple people
Cilla Black (1943–2015), English singer and actor
Charles Black (disambiguation), multiple people
Charly Black (born 1980), Jamaican reggae artist
Christina Black (born 1987), Canadian Curler 
Chris Black (disambiguation), multiple people
Claude Black (minister) (1916–2009), American Baptist minister and politician
Claude Black (musician) (1933–2013), American jazz pianist
Claudia Black (born 1972), Australian actor
Clint Black (born 1962), American country music singer-songwriter
Cofer Black (born 1950), American government official
Colin Black Australian composer/sound artist
Conrad Black (born 1944), member of the House of Lords (Baron Black of Crossharbour)
Crosby M. Black (1866-1916), American politician
Cyril Black (1902–1991), British Conservative politician (MP)
Cyril Edwin Black (1915–1989), American professor of modern Russian history

D
David Black (disambiguation), multiple people
Davidson Black (1884–1934), Canadian paleoanthropologist
Dick Black (disambiguation), multiple people
Don Black (disambiguation), multiple people
Donald Black (disambiguation), multiple people
Dorothy Black (disambiguation), multiple people
Douglas Black (disambiguation), multiple people
Duncan Black (1908–1991), Scottish economist
Dustin Lance Black (born 1974), American screenwriter

E
Edward Black (disambiguation), multiple people
Edwin Black, American journalist
Edwin Black (rhetorician) (1929–2007), American scholar of rhetorical criticism
Eric Black, Scottish Footballer
Eugene Black (disambiguation), multiple people
Eli Black, CEO who also committed suicide

F
Fischer Black (1938–1995), American economist
Francis Black (disambiguation), multiple people
Frank Black (disambiguation), multiple people

G
Gary Black (disambiguation), multiple people
Gaye Black, English punk-rock musician
George Black (disambiguation), multiple people
Gladys Black (1909–1998), American ornithologist

H
Halfdan the Black, 9th century Norse king
Harry Black (disambiguation), multiple people
Henry Black (disambiguation), multiple people
Hugh Black (disambiguation), multiple people
Hugo Black (1886–1971), American Supreme Court justice
Hugo Black Jr. (1922–2013), American lawyer
Hugo Black III (1953-2007), American lawyer

I
Ian Black (disambiguation), multiple people

J
Jack Black (disambiguation), multiple people
James Black (disambiguation), multiple people
Jeanne Black (1937–2014), American country singer
Jeff Black (disambiguation), multiple people
Jeremy Black (disambiguation), multiple people
John Black (disambiguation), multiple people
Jordan Black (disambiguation), multiple people
Joseph Black (disambiguation), multiple people
June Black (1910 - 2009), New Zealand ceramic artist and painter
J. R. Black (1826–1880), Scottish publisher and journalist

K
Karen Black (1939–2013), American actor
Kevin Black (disambiguation), multiple people

L
Lanie Black (1946-2010), American politician
Larry Black (disambiguation)
Laura Black (disambiguation), multiple people
Lawrence Black (1881–1959), English cricketer
Lewis Black (born 1948), American comedian, author and playwright
Lucas Black (born 1982), American actor

M
Marlon Black (born 1975), Trinidadian cricketer
Mary Black (disambiguation), multiple people
Max Black (disambiguation), multiple people
Maxine Black (disambiguation), multiple people
Mhairi Black (born 1994), Scottish National Party politician
Michael Black (disambiguation), multiple people

N
Neil Black (1932–2016), English oboist
Nissim Black (born 1986), American-Israeli rapper
Noel Black (1937–2014), American film director
Norman Black (born 1957), American basketball player and coach
Norman William Black (1931–1997), American federal judge

P
Paul Black (disambiguation), multiple people
Percy Black (1877–1917), Australian soldier in World War I
Peter Black (disambiguation), multiple people
Pippa Black (born 1982), Australian actor

R
Ralph Black (disambiguation), multiple people
Ray Black Jr. (born 1991), American race car driver
Rebecca Black (born 1997), American singer
Richard Black (1921–2014), American artist and illustrator
Robert Black (disambiguation), multiple people
Roger Black (born 1966), British runner
Roy Black (disambiguation), multiple people

S
Samuel Black (disambiguation), multiple people
Sarah Hearst Black (1846–?), American social reformer
Scott Black (disambiguation), multiple people
Shane Black (born 1961), American screenwriter and film director
Shirley Temple Black (1928–2014), American actress and diplomat
Simon Black (born 1979), Australian rules footballer
Stanley Black (1913–2002), English bandleader and composer
Stanley Black (businessman) (born 1932), American real estate investor and philanthropist
Sterling Foster Black (1924-1996), American lawyer
Steven Black (disambiguation), multiple people
Sue Black (disambiguation), multiple people
Susan Black (disambiguation), multiple people

T
Tarik Black (born 1991), American basketball player
Tarik Black (American football) (born 1998), American football player
Tony Black (writer), Scottish crime writer
Tori Black (born 1988), American pornographic actor
Thomas Black (disambiguation), multiple people

W
Wayne Black (born 1973), Zimbabwean tennis player
William Black (disambiguation), multiple people

Fictional characters
Bernard Black, fictional character in British sitcom Black Books
Billy Black, fictional character in the Twilight series
Chantay Black, fictional character in Degrassi: The Next Generation
Conrad Black, fictional character in Captain Scarlet and the Mysterons
Heather Black, fictional character in the British soap opera Brookside
Jacob Black, fictional character in the Twilight series
Sirius Black, fictional character in the Harry Potter novels
Regulus Black, fictional character in the Harry Potter novels
Bellatrix Lestrange (née Black), fictional character in the Harry Potter novels
Narcissa Malfoy (née Black), fictional character in the Harry Potter novels
Andromeda Tonks (née Black), fictional character in the Harry Potter novels
Tolkien Black, fictional character in South Park
Goku Black, fictional character in the Dragon Ball Super anime
Trooper Black, a minor character in the video game TimeSplitters 2

See also
Justice Black (disambiguation)

Scottish surnames
English-language surnames